Denisse Fuenmayor (born May 17, 1979) is a Venezuelan softball player and coach. She competed for Venezuela at the 2008 Summer Olympics.

References

Living people
1979 births
Olympic softball players of Venezuela
Softball players at the 2008 Summer Olympics
Venezuelan softball players

World Games silver medalists
Competitors at the 2013 World Games
People from Carabobo